Utetheisa diva is a moth in the family Erebidae. It was described by Paul Mabille in 1879. It is found on Réunion, Madagascar and the Seychelles.

References

Moths described in 1879
diva